Summer Storm is a 2004 German coming-of-age comedy-drama film directed by Marco Kreuzpaintner, starring Robert Stadlober, Kostja Ullmann, Alicja Bachleda-Curuś, and Miriam Morgenstern. The story is set to the background of a rowing regatta, which climaxes into a summer storm.

Plot
Teams from all across Germany descend on a quiet camping ground for a week of training leading up to a final rowing competition. The plot follows the members of the RSC rowing club from southern Germany as they train for the regatta.

The boys are excited by the prospects of camping with a female rowing team from Berlin. However, by a stroke of fate, the Berlin girls' team cancels and is replaced by Queerschlag ("Queerstrokes"), a gay youth rowing team, and these boys are out, proud, and vocal about it.

Amidst the occasionally tense interactions between the members of his team and those of Queerschlag, Tobi is himself forced to confront his long-time feelings for his close friend and teammate Achim, who is already romantically involved with his girlfriend Sandra. Spurned by Achim, Tobi is devastated, but is partly consoled by his new friendship with Queerschlag member Leo.

The tension between the members of the two teams culminates in a scene set to the backdrop of a summer storm, during which Leo confronts Tobi about his homosexuality in front of his teammates. Tobi denies being gay, and, in an attempt to defend him, one of his teammates tells Tobi's girlfriend Anke to tell the rest of his teammates so. Anke, the only person to whom Tobi has confided his secret, remains silent.

Ultimately, Tobi comes out to his teammates and his rowing team, who seem to accept Tobi no matter what, and they go on to compete with Queerschlag in the final regatta.

Cast
Robert Stadlober as Tobi
Kostja Ullmann as Achim
Alicja Bachleda-Curuś as Anke
Miriam Morgenstern as Sandra
Jürgen Tonkel as Hansi
Tristano Casanova as Georg
Marlon Kittel as Leo
Hanno Koffler as Malte
Ludwig Blochberger as Oli
Alexa Maria Surholt as Susanne
Joseph M'Barek as Ferdinand "Ferdi"

Critical reception
Summer Storm received mixed reviews, currently holding a 48% rating on review aggregator website Rotten Tomatoes based on 31 reviews. On Metacritic, the film has a 51/100 rating, signifying "mixed or average reviews".

According to Dennis Harvey of Variety, the film have "…psychologically sharp writing and performances".

Michael Wilmington of Chicago Tribune said that "Summer Storm is a contemporary teen summer romance with a modern sexual twist" and "believable characters".

Steve Murray of The Atlanta Journal-Constitution "Summer Storm nicely captures the awkward confusion of first-time sexual encounters (gay or straight) and the collateral wounds caused by deceiving others and oneself".

German website Kabeleins praised the film for being "beautifully produced" and actors as "very authentically played".

London-based branch of Time Out wrote that "...the story's main strength lies in its characters..."

TV Guide's Alexander Ryll called the film  "An observant and sensitively played drama about adolescent sexuality, unrequited love and heartbreak", while Kevin Thomas of Los Angeles Times said that "Kreuzpaintner displays a natural gift with actors and a clarity in storytelling that result in a fresh take on what otherwise might have been a familiar coming-of-age story." Ella Taylor of LA Weekly also commented on the film, calling it "A lovely wallow in the sweaty pains and joys of mostly gay adolescent love".

Accolades
Summer Storm received the audience award of the Filmfest München 2004.
Director (Marco Kreuzpaintner), New Faces Award, Germany, 2005
Best Young Actor – Film (Robert Stadlober)

Soundtrack
The soundtrack contains the smash hit "Willkommen" from the album Herz by the German duo Rosenstolz; the single made the German Top 10 charts in September 2004.
"Blonde on Blonde" by Nada Surf
"Shake the Foundation" by Radio 4
"Willkommen" by Rosenstolz
"Los, Wixen" by Niki Reiser
"Auf ins Bergische" by Niki Reiser
"We'll Never Know" by Roman Fischer
"Maltes Kuss" by Niki Reiser
"Flames" by VAST
"Verwirrt" by Niki Reiser
"Achim" by Niki Reiser
"Getaway" by Roman Fischer
"Jim's Theme" by Niki Reiser
"Coming Out" by Niki Reiser
"Catch Me" by Kerosin
"We Oh We" by The Hidden Cameras
"Crooked Lines" by The Go-Betweens
"For Lovers" by Wolfman/Pete Doherty
"The Power of Love" by Frankie Goes to Hollywood
"Sommersturm" by Niki Reiser
"The Summer We Had" by Nova International
"Go West" by Nova International

References

External links
 
 

Ruderverein QueerSchlag

2004 romantic comedy-drama films
2000s coming-of-age comedy-drama films
2004 independent films
2004 LGBT-related films
2000s teen comedy-drama films
2000s teen romance films
Coming-of-age romance films
Films about sexual repression
Films directed by Marco Kreuzpaintner
Gay-related films
German romantic comedy-drama films
German coming-of-age comedy-drama films
German independent films
German LGBT-related films
German sports comedy-drama films
Juvenile sexuality in films
LGBT-related romantic comedy-drama films
LGBT-related coming-of-age films
LGBT-related sports comedy-drama films
Rowing films
2000s sports comedy-drama films
Films about summer camps
Teen LGBT-related films
Teen sports films
2000s German films